Alessandra Cappellotto (born August 27, 1968) is a retired racing cyclist from Italy. She represented her native country at two consecutive Summer Olympics: 1996, and 2000. She won the world title in the women's individual road race at the 1997 UCI Road World Championships in San Sebastian, Spain. Valeria Cappellotto, who died in 2015, was her sister.

She helped five Afghan cyclists to escape their country and settle in Italy, following the 2021 Taliban offensive.

References

External links

1968 births
Living people
Italian female cyclists
Cyclists at the 1996 Summer Olympics
Cyclists at the 2000 Summer Olympics
Olympic cyclists of Italy
Cyclists from the Province of Vicenza
UCI Road World Champions (women)
20th-century Italian women
21st-century Italian women